Wednesday Night in San Francisco is a blues album by Albert King, recorded live in 1968 at the Fillmore Auditorium. This album, together with Thursday Night in San Francisco, contains leftovers recorded live on the same dates as Live Wire/Blues Power. Wednesday Night in San Francisco, released in 1990, contains material recorded on June 26, 1968.

Track listing

Personnel
 Albert King – electric guitar, vocals
 Willie James Exon – guitar
 James Washington – organ
 Roosevelt Pointer – bass
 Theotis Morgan – drums

References

1990 live albums
Albert King live albums
Albums produced by Al Jackson Jr.
Albums recorded at the Fillmore
Stax Records live albums
Live blues albums